In direct response to Pennsylvania Democratic Party v. Boockvar and the 2020 United States presidential election in Pennsylvania, the Donald Trump 2020 presidential campaign launched numerous lawsuits contesting the purview of the Pennsylvania Supreme Court and the election processes of Pennsylvania. All of these have either been dismissed or dropped. The last two remaining cases were dismissed without comment by the Supreme Court on February 22, 2021. On April 19, 2021, more than five months after the November 3, 2020 election, the Supreme Court declined to hear the outstanding case brought by former Republican congressional candidate Jim Bognet, dismissing it without comment.

Summary of lawsuits

Barnette v. Lawrence 
On November 4, 2020, 4th congressional district candidate Kathy Barnette sued Montgomery County officials in federal district court. Barnette claimed the county's board of elections violated the state's election code by inspecting ballot envelopes for missing information, a process known as pre-canvassing, and by giving voters a chance to correct such deficiencies. Barnett also claimed that the federal equal protection clause was violated because only certain voters were allowed the chance to cure. Barnette asked the county to reject any affected ballots. On November 6, Judge Timothy J. Savage denied the plaintiffs' request.

Donald J. Trump for President v. Boockvar

U.S. District Court case 
Donald J. Trump for President v. Boockvar is a lawsuit filed in U.S. District Court on November 9 by the Trump campaign against Democratic counties in Pennsylvania. The campaign challenged the results of the election, alleging  and asked the court to prohibit the certification of results. The Ohio-based Porter Wright Morris & Arthur law firm that represented the Trump campaign withdrew from the case on November 13, and Linda A. Kerns, a Republican attorney also representing the Trump campaign, asked the judge for permission to withdraw from the case on November16. Overall, the case saw three different sets of lawyers within a week.

When the judge asked Trump's lawyer, Rudy Giuliani, on why the plaintiffs did not advance legal claims based on voter fraud, Giuliani replied that "this is not a fraud case". Giuliani had previously made public claims of "fraud", "absolute fraud" in the election. Fellow Trump lawyer Linda Kerns also agreed that this lawsuit was not based on "allegations of fraud or misconduct".

Judge Matthew W. Brann dismissed the case with prejudice on November21, citing "strained legal arguments without merit and speculative accusations", noting that "[i]n the United States of America, this cannot justify the disenfranchisement of a single voter, let alone all the voters of its sixth most populated state... [o]ur people, laws and institutions demand more". He likened the Trump team argument to "Frankenstein's Monster", and characterized the requested remedy to disqualify nearly seven million votes as "unhinged from the underlying right being asserted".

Appeals Court case 
The Trump campaign and other plaintiffs filed an appeal with the United States Court of Appeals for the Third Circuit on November22. In their revised brief, the campaign asked that the election be decertified and they be permitted to take a sample consisting of 1.5 million mail ballots to determine how many were defective, and deduct those votes from Biden's total.

On November 27, a three-judge panel for the Third Circuit Court of Appeals rejected the Trump campaign's attempt to undo  Pennsylvania's vote certification, with the judges ruling that the Trump campaign's "claims have no merit." The panel stated that the Trump campaign was challenging far fewer ballots than Biden's margin of victory, and "it never claims fraud or that any votes were cast by illegal voters."

The panel praised the District Court for being "fast, fair, patient" in handling this case. It ruled that the District Court was correct in preventing the Trump campaign from conducting a second amendment of its complaint. The proposed amendment had not changed the fact that the Trump campaign had not alleged that it was being treated worse than the Biden campaign, stated the panel. Overall, "calling an election unfair does not make it so. Charges require specific allegations and then proof. We have neither here", stated the panel.

Of the three Appeal Court judges, Stephanos Bibas, who delivered the opinion, was appointed by Trump, while judges  D. Brooks Smith and Michael Chagares were appointed by Republican president George W. Bush. Trump campaign attorney Jenna Ellis reacted to the verdict by condemning the "activist judicial machinery in Pennsylvania". Ellis also said that an appeal would be taken to the United States Supreme Court.

Donald J. Trump for President v. Boockvar and Cty. Bds. of Elections 
Donald J. Trump for President v. Kathy Boockvar and County Boards of Elections is a lawsuit filed in the Commonwealth Court of Pennsylvania on November 4, by the Trump campaign. The campaign challenged guidance from the Pennsylvania Secretary of State Kathy Boockvar, who told voters they had until November 12 to provide proof of identification in order for their ballots to be counted, three days past the deadline set by state law. The judge ruled that ballots are not to be counted if identification has not been shown by November 9. This ruling affected a small number of ballots that were not included in the vote count.

Donald J. Trump for President v. Bucks Cty. Bd. of Elections 
Donald J. Trump for President Inc. v. Bucks County Board of Elections is a lawsuit filed by the Trump campaign and others in the Pennsylvania Court of Common Pleas on November 9, 2020. The plaintiffs appealed the decision of the board to count over 2,200 ballots that lacked a date or voter address, or were not sealed with secrecy sleeves, claiming the votes are invalid. The lawyers for the Trump campaign have signed an agreement that they "do not allege, and there is no evidence of, any fraud in connection with the challenged ballots." They also declared that they were not alleging votes from dead people, "misconduct", or "impropriety" related to those ballots, and had no evidence of such happenings.

Judge Robert O. Baldi denied the plaintiffs petition and ordered all ballots to be counted. The Trump campaign appealed the decision; on November 25, the Commonwealth Court also ruled that all ballots should be counted.

The Trump campaign filed an emergency petition in the Pennsylvania Supreme Court, asking for review of the case, and on December 8, the court denied the petition for appeal.

Donald J. Trump for President v. Montgomery Cty. Bd. of Elections 
Donald J. Trump for President v. Montgomery County Board of Elections is a lawsuit filed in the state's trial court on November 5, in which the Trump campaign sought to stop Montgomery County from counting ballots. The county's Board of Elections allowed about 600 voters to fill in missing information on ballot envelopes before Election Day. The campaign argued for the ballots to be disqualified, but the judge ruled the instructions provided to voters were consistent with election law.

During the hearing, the judge asked the lawyer for the Trump campaign, Jonathan Goldstein, if Goldstein was "claiming that there is any fraud" or "any undue or improper influence upon the elector with respect to these 592 ballots". Goldstein replied 'No.' 

Goldstein's answer to the court was consistent with the pleadings in the case brought by Goldstein which pleadings did not allege fraud and only made a technical challenge to the counting of certain ballots due to certain facial defects in those ballots. The Bucks County Common Pleas Court ruled the ballots should be counted.  Pennsylvania's intermediate appellate court, the Commonwealth Court, later ruled that certain Allegheny County ballots to which a similar challenge was made should not be counted for the reasons Goldstein argued in the Bucks County pleading, namely that the ballots did not comply with Pennsylvania's laws governing the technical requirements of casting a ballot.

Donald J. Trump for President v. Philadelphia Cty. Bd. of Elections 
Donald J. Trump for President v. Philadelphia County Board of Elections is a lawsuit filed in federal court on November 5, in which the Trump campaign sought to stop ballot counting in Philadelphia. The campaign argued that poll observers were not allowed in the counting room, but later admitted some observers were present. No ballots were at issue, and the case was settled upon mutual party agreement that Republicans and Democrats could have each have up to 60 poll watchers present to observe vote counting. The admission that Trump's observers were in the counting room contradicted Trump's later claims that his observers were prevented from entering vote counting rooms in Pennsylvania.

One of the Trump campaign's lawyers in the case, Jerome Marcus, filed a motion in federal court on January 7, 2021, arguing that Trump "has used the lawyer’s services to perpetrate a crime" and that Marcus should therefore be allowed to withdraw from the case as a matter of principle.

Hamm v. Boockvar 
Hamm v. Boockvar is a lawsuit filed in the Commonwealth Court of Pennsylvania on November 3. Pennsylvania Secretary of State, Kathy Boockvar, issued guidance that local election officials could allow voters who cast defective ballots to re-do their vote by casting a provisional ballot. The plaintiffs, several candidates who ran for office, argued that such guidance is illegal. The court ordered counties to set aside any provisional ballots cast by voters who sought to remedy defective initial ballots, and said it would rule on those ballots' validity at a later date.

In re: Canvass of Absentee and Mail-In Ballots of November 3, 2020, Gen. Election 
Each lawsuit in this set of five against  Philadelphia County Board of Elections is called In re: Canvass of Absentee and Mail-In Ballots of November 3, 2020, General Election.  Each identifies a different issue about how voters completed the declaration on the outer ballot envelope. The five lawsuits were filed in the PA Court of Common Pleas (the state's trial court) on November 10, in which the Trump campaign sought to disqualify over 8,000 absentee ballots counted by state officials. The ballots had outer envelopes which were signed by the voters but lacked various other information filled out on the declaration on the envelope. Judge James Crumlish denied all challenges to the ballots.

On appeal to the PA Commonwealth Court, the five cases were combined into one. Before oral arguments, the case was transferred to the Pennsylvania Supreme Court, where the court rejected the Trump campaign's appeals on November 23.

In re: Canvassing Observation 
In re: Canvassing Observation is a lawsuit filed on November 3, in which the Trump campaign sought closer access for poll observers to watch vote counting. The trial court ruled against the campaign, that a  distance was adequate. On November 9, the state filed an appeal to the Pennsylvania Supreme Court.

The Supreme Court of Pennsylvania ruled 5–2 on November 17 against the Trump campaign, saying Pennsylvania law requires only that observers must be allowed in the room where ballots are counted but does not set a minimum distance between them and the counting tables; local county officials are left to decide. Chief Justice Thomas Saylor dissented, saying he would have declared the issue moot.

In re: Motion for Injunctive Relief of Northampton Cty. Republican Committee 
On November 3, 2020, a group including Republican candidates and officials made an oral motion in state court, asking the court to prevent the Northampton Board of Elections from identifying cancelled ballots in order to help voters cure them; the court denied the motion.

Kelly v. Pennsylvania 
On November 22, 2020, U.S. Representative Mike Kelly and six other Republican representatives filed a suit in the Commonwealth Court of Pennsylvania that claims that the Pennsylvania General Assembly had no authority under the state constitution to enact no-excuse mail-in voting. They sued to stop the certification of electors until the issue could be resolved. The legislation in question is Act 77 (Act of October 31, 2019, P.L 552, No. 77).  It was passed on October 31, 2019, and allowed voting by mail without providing an excuse, which was previously required. The bill was passed in the Republican-majority assembly with near-unanimous support by the Republicans. Pennsylvania joined 31 other states and Washington, D.C. with mail-in voting without excuses.

On November 25, Judge Patricia McCullough ruled to halt further state certifications pending a hearing. The state attorney general responded by filing an immediate appeal to the state Supreme Court, which triggered an automatic stay on Judge McCullough's order. On November 25, the Department of State issued a press release dated November 24, stating: "Following certification of the presidential vote submitted by all 67 counties late Monday, Secretary of State Kathy Boockvar today certified the results of the November 3 election in Pennsylvania for president and vice president of the United States." Having issued the press release (without updating the certified results on the State website), the defendants sought to moot the case. On November 27, Judge McCullough issued an opinion that explained her ruling to block the certification process, arguing that there is a reasonable constitutionality argument, the certification process had not been completed, and that the certification announcement was only for the President / Vice President race and not for the other races on the ballots.

The Pennsylvania Supreme Court ruled on November 28 to unanimously overturn the Commonwealth Court's order to block the certification of election results in Pennsylvania. The Pennsylvania Supreme Court also dismissed with prejudice the requests of the Republicans to either invalidate all 2.5 million mail-in ballots in Pennsylvania, or to invalidate all 6.9 million ballots in the state and have the state's Republican-controlled Legislature choose the presidential electors for the state. The rationale for the decision was that the Republicans were challenging the law too late; they had been able to challenge the law since it came into force in October 2019, but only filed the lawsuit when the results of the November 2020 election were "becoming seemingly apparent". Hence, the Republicans had failed to act with "due diligence" in their handling of the case.

Kelly appealed to the US Supreme Court, and on December 3, 2020, Justice Samuel Alito set a deadline of December 9, one day after the safe-harbor date for Pennsylvania officials to respond to the request to throw out the state's mail-in voting results, or possibly even the entire election. But, the deadline was later changed to 9 am, December 8, so within the safe-harbor deadline. In complying with the change, the Commonwealth's attorneys stated:"Petitioners [Kelly and others] ask this Court to undertake one of the most dramatic, disruptive invocations of judicial power in the history of the Republic. No court has ever issued an order nullifying a governor's certification of presidential election results. And for good reason: "Once the door is opened to judicial invalidation of presidential election results, it will be awfully hard to close that door again. . . . The loss of public trust in our constitutional order resulting from the exercise of this kind of judicial power would be incalculable."On December 8, 2020, the Supreme Court rejected the request in a one-sentence, unsigned order; by the time of the high court's decision, the Pennsylvania election results had been certified in Biden's favor.

Pirkle v. Wolf 
On November 10, 2020, four voters sued to block votes from being counted in Philadelphia, Montgomery, Delaware and Allegheny counties. The plaintiffs claimed the state violated the Equal Protection Clause by allowing counties to have varying practices for mail-in ballots. Porter Wright, the law firm that represented the Trump campaign, asked to withdraw. On November 16, the plaintiffs voluntarily dismissed the suit. The claims made by plaintiffs in this lawsuit are similar to Brooks v. Mahoney and Bally v. Whitmer; these lawsuits were all filed by conservative lawyer James Bopp. The plaintiffs also cited Trump v. Boockvar.

Ziccarelli v. Allegheny Cty. Bd. of Elections

November 12 lawsuit 
On November 12, 2020, Nicole Ziccarelli, a Republican state Senate candidate, sued the Allegheny County Board of Elections in state court. The plaintiff claimed that the board improperly counted 2,349 mail-in ballots that were not dated by the voter, and sought to exclude these votes from being counted. On November 18, 2020, the state's Court of Common Pleas denied the plaintiffs request, ordering the votes to be counted. Ziccarelli appealed the decision on November 19; the following day, the state's Commonwealth Court ruled that the election code requires the voter to date their ballot, and the 2,349 ballots in question should not be counted.

The Supreme Court of Pennsylvania consolidated this case with In re: Canvass of Absentee and Mail-In Ballots of November 3, 2020, Gen. Election, and on November 23, affirmed the decision of the decision of the Allegheny County Board of Elections to count the 2,349 ballots at issue.

November 16 lawsuit 
On November 16, 2020, Nicole Ziccarelli, a Republican state Senate candidate, filed a second lawsuit in state court against the Allegheny County Board of Elections. Ziccarelli challenged the decision of the board to count 270 provisional ballots that lacked one of two signatures. The Court of Common Pleas ruled that the ballots should be counted. Ziccarelli appealed; the Commonwealth Court reversed the lower court's decision, ruling that the statute at issue requires both signatures and the ballots should not be counted. On November 23, the Pennsylvania Supreme Court denied the board's petition for appeal.

Notes

References 

Post-election lawsuits related to the 2020 United States presidential election
United States lawsuits